Ortiz Island is an island in the Duroch Islands. The name was given by Martin Halpern, leader of the University of Wisconsin (USARP) field party which geologically mapped the Duroch Islands, 1961–62. It honors Marcos Ortiz G., Captain of the Chilean ship its study of this area.

See also 
 List of Antarctic and sub-Antarctic islands

Islands of the Duroch Islands